Siba or SIBA may refer to:

Places
 Siba, Luocheng County, Guangxi, China, a town
 Siba State, a princely state of India until 1947
 Siba subdistrict, Basra Governorate, Iraq
 Šiba, a village in Bardejov District, Slovakia
 Siba Castle, a Sassanid castle in Kukherd District, Iran

People
 Siba culture, a Bronze Age culture in China from the 14th to 11th century BC
 Sutanphaa or Siba Singha, king of Assam from 1714 to 1744
 Hajrudin Krvavac (1926–1992), Bosnian film director nicknamed "Šiba"
 Siba Mtongana (born 1984), South African chef, host of the TV show Siba's Table
 Siba Shakib, Iranian/German filmmaker, writer and political activist
 Siba (singer), Brazilian singer Sérgio Roberto Veloso de Oliveira (born 1969)
 Rhizlane Siba (born 1996), Moroccan track and field athlete
 Walter Siba, the third Anglican Bishop of Ysabel, Melanesia

Acronyms
 SIBA (retailer), a Swedish home electronics retail chain, now Net On Net
 SIBA Elektrik G.m.b.H, also SIBA Electric Ltd, former manufacturers of the Dynastart combined starter motor and alternator
 Society of Independent Brewers, an association representing brewing companies in the United Kingdom
 Southern Independent Booksellers Alliance, a trade association representing booksellers in the United States

Other uses
 Siba (GCHP Stone Run Afternoon Tea), Best in Show winner of the 2020 Westminster Kennel Club Dog Show 
 Siba, a prototype character who did not make it into the Virtua Fighter video game series

See also
 Sibah (born 1970), Bolivian singer-songwriter